Hear Word! or Hear Word! Naija Woman Talk True is a play by Ifeoma Fafunwa.  It tells stories about Nigerian women and their struggles.

The play premiered in Lagos, Nigeria in 2014 at the Musical Society of Nigeria (MUSON) Centre and had its international debut at Harvard University in Cambridge, Massachusetts. It was produced by  iOpeneye Limited.

The playwright was inspired byVagina Monologues" and "For Colored Girls who have Considered Suicide. The play combines song and dance and is performed agitprop on stage or in open air spaces,.

Hear Word! is the first Nigerian stage play to appear at the American Repertory Theatre.

Description 
Hear Word! runs for 90 minutes and is delivered by a cast of 10 female performers, 3 male percussionists and 1 female director. It is agitprop theater and can be performed without a set or in a site-specific location, combining song, dance, sketches and soliloquies. The cast will sometimes do street storms, performing the show unannounced in markets, bus stops and university campuses.

Hear Word! is a piece of Nigerian performance art that combines artistry, social commentary and true-life stories of gender inequality and transformation. The show targets real issues affecting the lives of women and which limit their potential for independence, leadership and meaningful contribution to society.

Plot
The play starts off with lighthearted and somewhat humorous monologues depicting everyday situations where women navigate a patriarchal world in which they are marginalized. Groping, harassment, exclusion etc. including scenes which boldly highlight ways in which women themselves contribute to their own marginalization.

This lightheartedness soon gives way to a section of vivid monologues portraying harmful ways in which women are victimized and oppressed, including molestation, child brides and gender based violence and abuse. This painful section is punctuated by a shrill call to action chant in Yoruba which ushers in an exhilarating and refreshing second half of the play with powerful portraits of resistance, triumph and celebration. The final piece re-captures the different themes in the play with a direct appeal to audiences to get engaged in becoming part of the solution.

Background and meaning
Hear Word! is derived from a Nigerian Pidgin-English phrase, which means to "Listen and Comply". The play was created and co-written by Ifeoma Fafunwa, a Nigerian playwright and director.  Fafunwa started her career as an Architect in the United States, where she worked for at least 20 years. She returned to Nigeria and in 2009, began curating real-life stories, from women across Nigeria, as well as her own personal stories to produce the play, Hear Word!.

The play presents an intimate view into the obstacles that Nigerian women face, including stories of domestic violence, absence of women from positions of power, resilience and resistance, shattering the culture of silence, overturning the status quo, abuse, disrespect, bravery, sisterhood and joy.

Reception
In 2018, Hear Word! sold out to a diverse audience at American Repertory Theater. The production was featured as the event opener for the United Nations 2018 Commission for the Status of Women in March 2018.

The Harvard Crimson in its review of the play, praised its ability to address the pain of abuse and harassment, stating that it was achieved flawlessly due to the masterful script and to the actresses who handle the conflicting feelings with care.

On 31 December 2018, the cast and crew of Hear Word! were hosted to a 'meet & greet' by Air France at the Muritala Mohammed Airport in Lagos, airport patrons were treated to a flash-mob performance and photo-ops with cast members.

In January 2019 the play debuted at New York’s premiere off-Broadway - the Public Theater, and was described by Theater Mania as a  "jubilant act of artistic exorcism". A review in the New York Times stated "By the end of "Hear Word! Naija Woman Talk True," from the Nigerian company iOpenEye Ltd., the brightness radiating from its all-female cast has the glare and heat of a raging bonfire."

Hear Word! has also premiered at the Segerstrom Center in Costa Mesa, California the Thalia Theater in Hamburg, Germany and the Royal Lyceum Theater at the Edinburgh Festival in Scotland in August, 2019.

References 

English-language plays
Nigerian plays
2010s debut plays